Kalupe is a settlement in Kalupe Parish, Augšdaugava Municipality in the Latgale region of Latvia.

References

External links 
 Satellite map at Maplandia.com
 Kołup in the Geographical Dictionary of the Kingdom of Poland

Towns and villages in Latvia
Augšdaugava Municipality
Dvinsky Uyezd
Latgale